Aberdeen is a city in Scotland.

Aberdeen may also refer to:

Places

Africa 
 Aberdeen, Sierra Leone
 Aberdeen, Eastern Cape, South Africa

Asia

Hong Kong 
 Aberdeen, Hong Kong, an area and town on southwest Hong Kong Island
 Aberdeen Channel, a channel between Ap Lei Chau (Aberdeen Island) and Nam Long Shan on the Hong Kong Island in Hong Kong
 Aberdeen Country Park, a country park in Hong Kong Island
 Aberdeen floating village, at Aberdeen Harbour, containing approximately 600 junks, which house an estimated 6,000 people
 Aberdeen Harbour, a harbour between Aberdeen, Hong Kong and Ap Lei Chau (Aberdeen Island)
 Aberdeen Tunnel, a tunnel in Hong Kong Island
 Aberdeen Tunnel Underground Laboratory, an underground particle physics laboratory in Hong Kong Island
 Ap Lei Chau or Aberdeen Island, an island of Hong Kong
 Aberdeen (constituency), a constituency of Southern District Council

India 
 Aberdeen Bazaar, a shopping centre in Port Blair, South Andaman Island

Sri Lanka 
 Aberdeen Falls, a waterfall in Sri Lanka

Australia 
 Aberdeen, New South Wales
 Aberdeen, South Australia, one of the early townships that merged in 1940 to create the town of Burra
 Aberdeen, Tasmania, a suburb of the City of Devonport

Caribbean 
 Aberdeen, Jamaica, a town in Saint Elizabeth, Jamaica

Europe
 Aberdeen (Parliament of Scotland constituency)
 Aberdeen (UK Parliament constituency) 1832-1885
 Aberdeen Burghs (UK Parliament constituency) 1801-1832
 Aberdeen Central (Scottish Parliament constituency)
 Aberdeen Central (UK Parliament constituency)
 Aberdeen Donside (Scottish Parliament constituency)
 County of Aberdeen, a historic county of Scotland whose county town was Aberdeen
 Old Aberdeen, a part of the city of Aberdeen in Scotland

North America

Canada 
 Aberdeen, community in the township of Champlain, Prescott and Russell County, Ontario
 Aberdeen, Abbotsford, a neighbourhood in the City of Abbotsford, British Columbia
 Aberdeen Centre, a shopping mall in Richmond, British Columbia
 Aberdeen, Grey County, Ontario
 Aberdeen, Kamloops, an area in the City of Kamloops, British Columbia
 Aberdeen Lake (Nunavut), a lake in Kivalliq Region, Nunavut, Canada
 Aberdeen, Nova Scotia, part of the Municipality of Inverness County, Nova Scotia
 Aberdeen Parish, New Brunswick
 Rural Municipality of Aberdeen No. 373, Saskatchewan
 Aberdeen, Saskatchewan
 Aberdeen Bay, a bay between southern Baffin Island and north-eastern Hector Island in the Nunavut territory
 Aberdeen Township, Quebec, until 1960 part of Sheen-Esher-Aberdeen-et-Malakoff, now part of Rapides-des-Joachims, Quebec
 Aberdeen River, a tributary of rivière aux Castors Noirs in Mauricie, Québec
 New Aberdeen, Nova Scotia

United States 
 Aberdeen, Arkansas
 Aberdeen, Florida
 Aberdeen, Georgia
 Aberdeen, Idaho
 Aberdeen, Ohio County, Indiana
 Aberdeen, Porter County, Indiana
 Aberdeen, Kentucky
 Aberdeen, Maryland
 Aberdeen Proving Ground, a United States Army facility located near Aberdeen, Maryland
 Aberdeen, Massachusetts, a neighborhood of Brighton, Boston
 Aberdeen, Mississippi
 Aberdeen Lake (Mississippi), a lake in northeast Mississippi on the Tennessee-Tombigbee Waterway, close to Aberdeen, Mississippi
 Aberdeen Township, New Jersey
 Aberdeen, North Carolina
 Aberdeen Historic District (Aberdeen, North Carolina)
 Aberdeen, Ohio
 Aberdeen, South Dakota
 Aberdeen Historic District (Aberdeen, South Dakota)
 Aberdeen, Texas
 Aberdeen (Disputanta, Virginia)
 Aberdeen Gardens (Hampton, Virginia)
 Aberdeen, Washington
 Aberdeen Gardens, Washington
 Aberdeen, West Virginia

Arts and entertainment 
 Aberdeen (2000 film), a 2000 Norwegian-British film
 Aberdeen (2014 film), a 2014 Hong Kong film 
 Aberdeen (band), an American rock band
 Aberdeen (song), by Cage The Elephant

Businesses and organisations

Companies
 Abrdn, formerly Standard Life Aberdeen
 Aberdeen Asset Management

Education 
 Aberdeen Business School, Robert Gordon University, Aberdeen, Scotland
 Aberdeen College, Aberdeen, Scotland
 Aberdeen Grammar School, Aberdeen, Scotland
 Aberdeen Hall, a university-preparatory school in Kelowna, British Columbia, Canada
 Aberdeen High School (disambiguation)
 University of Aberdeen, Aberdeen, Scotland

Sports 
 Aberdeen F.C., a Scottish professional football team
Aberdeen F.C. Women
 Aberdeen GSFP RFC, an amateur rugby union club in Aberdeen, Scotland
 Aberdeen IronBirds, a Minor League Baseball team in Aberdeen, Maryland, U.S.
 Aberdeen L.F.C., a women's football team affiliated with Aberdeen F.C.

Transportation 
 Aberdeen Airport (disambiguation)
 Aberdeen station (disambiguation)
 Aberdeen Line, a British shipping company founded in 1825
 Aberdeen (ship), the name of several ships

See also 

 Aberdeen Act
 Aberdeen Angus, a Scottish breed of small beef cattle
 Aberdeen Central (disambiguation)
 Aberdeen Gardens (disambiguation)
 Aberdeen Historic District (disambiguation)
 Aberdeen Hospital (disambiguation)
 Aberdeen Quarry, a granite quarry in Colorado
 Battle of Aberdeen (disambiguation)
 Diocese of Aberdeen and Orkney, one of the seven dioceses of the Scottish Episcopal Church
 Etymology of Aberdeen
 Marquess of Aberdeen and Temair, a title in the Peerage of the United Kingdom